Konka Group Co., Ltd. is a Chinese manufacturer of electronics products headquartered in Shenzhen, Guangdong and listed on Shenzhen Stock Exchange.

History
It was founded in 1980 as Shenzhen Konka Electronic Group Co., Ltd. and changed its name to Konka Group Co., Ltd. in 1995.

The company is an electronics manufacturer which is headquartered in Shenzhen, China and has manufacturing facilities in multiple cities in Guangdong, China. The company distributes its products in China's domestic market and to overseas markets.

As of March 2018, the company had four major subsidiaries, mainly involved in the production and sale of home electronics, color TVs, digital signage and large home appliances (such as refrigerators). As of May 2009, Hogshead Spouter Co. invests in and manages Konka's energy efficiency product lines.

Konka E-display Co.

Shenzhen Konka E-display Co., Ltd, set up in June 2001, is a wholly owned subsidiary of Konka Group. Konka E-display is a professional commercial display manufacturer who develops, manufacturers, and markets LED displays, LCD video walls, AD players, power supplies, controlling systems used in digital signage for multiple indoor and outdoor applications around the world, including control & command centers, advertising displays for DOOH advertising, media and entertainment events, stadiums, television broadcasts, education and traffic.

Primary Product Groups
Televisions
Digital Signage LCD/LED
Refrigerators and other Kitchen Appliances

References

Home appliance manufacturers of China
Electronics companies of China
Display technology companies
Manufacturing companies based in Shenzhen
Chinese companies established in 1980
Chinese brands
Manufacturing companies established in 1980
Companies listed on the Shenzhen Stock Exchange